<noinclude>
This is a list of airlines which have an air operator's certificate issued by the Civil Aviation Authority  of Venezuela.

See also
List of airlines
List of defunct airlines of Venezuela

References

 
Airlines
Venezuela
Airlines
Venezuela